Division No. 10 is a census division in Alberta, Canada. It is located in the east-central portion of central Alberta and includes Alberta's portion of the City of Lloydminster.

Census subdivisions 
The following census subdivisions (municipalities or municipal equivalents) are located within Alberta's Division No. 10.

Cities
Camrose
Lloydminster
Towns
Bashaw
Bruderheim
Lamont
Mundare
Tofield
Two Hills
Vegreville
Vermilion
Viking
Villages
Andrew
Bawlf
Bittern Lake
Chipman
Edberg
Hay Lakes
Holden
Innisfree
Kitscoty
Mannville
Marwayne
Myrnam
Paradise Valley
Rosalind
Ryley
Municipal districts
Beaver County
Camrose County
Lamont County
Minburn No. 27, County of
Two Hills No. 21, County of
Vermilion River, County of
Indian reserves
Makaoo (Part) 120

Demographics 

See also 
List of census divisions of Alberta
List of communities in Alberta

References

Census divisions of Alberta